Mark Batty Publisher is an American independent book-publishing company, specializing in illustrated books on the art of communication: photography, art and design, graffiti and urban art; pop culture, typography and other related topics.

History and operations
The company was founded in 2003 by Mark Batty, former President of Association Typographique Internationale (ATypI), former CEO of International Typeface Corporation (ITC) Fonts and former editor of ITC Font's Upper & Lower Case Magazine (U&lc).

It is based in the Brooklyn borough of New York City, New York, and publishes approximately three new titles a month, growing from 2005's twelve released titles in total, with a back title list of about 100.

Imprints and divisions
The company's sole imprint is Mark Batty Publisher Academic, with the purpose to produce niche titles about design and typography. The most recent title is the second in a series of Typography Monographs, called Size-specific adjustments to type designs which discusses how type designs vary depending on point size.

Publications
Celebrity Vinyl (2008)

See also

 List of companies based in New York City
 List of English-language book publishing companies

References

External links
 "The Kindle Can't Scare Me" article by Mark Batty on Forbes.com
 Microsoft Typography News. "Batty throws in with Thames." May 16, 2007.
 MBP Mission, Mark Batty Publisher web

2003 establishments in New York City
Book publishing companies based in New York (state)
Companies based in Brooklyn
Publishing companies established in 2003